Old Calendarists (Greek: palaioimerologitai or palaioimerologites), also known as Old Feasters (palaioeortologitai), Genuine Orthodox Christians or True Orthodox Christians (GOC), are traditionalist groups of Eastern Orthodox Christians who separated from mainstream Eastern Orthodox churches because some of the latter adopted the revised Julian calendar while Old Calendarists remained committed to the Julian calendar. Old Calendarists are not in communion with any mainstream Eastern Orthodox churches. "Old Calendarists" is another name for the True Orthodox movement in Romania, Bulgaria, Greece and Cyprus.

Terminology
Mainstream Eastern Orthodox Christians which use the old (Julian) calendar are not what is designated by the expression "Old Calendarist", because they remain in communion with the Eastern Orthodox churches that use the new calendar (the Revised Julian calendar). Old Calendarists have severed communion with the mainstream Eastern Orthodox which follow the old calendar, because the latter maintained communion with Eastern Orthodox churches which had adopted the revised calendar. Thus, to be "Old Calendarist" is not the same thing as only following the old calendar. The Russian Orthodox Church, for instance, is not Old Calendarist, but follows the old (Julian) calendar.

History

Background 
Until 1924, the Eastern Orthodox Church universally used the Julian calendar, whereas the Roman Catholic Church, under Pope Gregory XIII, conducted a calendar reform and adopted the mediaeval Gregorian calendar in 1582. The difference between the two calendars is 13 days between 1900 and 2100.

1923 Congress 

In May 1923, the Pan-Orthodox Council of Constantinople, called by Patriarch Meletius IV of Constantinople, adopted the Revised Julian calendar. This new calendar was different to the Julian calendar, and would not diverge from the Gregorian calendar for a further 800 years. The Revised Julian calendar replaced the tabular date of Easter of the Julian calendar with an astronomical date of Easter. Not all Eastern Orthodox churches were represented at the congress or adopted its decisions, and the Russian Orthodox Church and some other Eastern Orthodox churches have continued to use the Julian calendar liturgically to this day.

Birth

Greece 

In 1924, the Church of Greece adopted the Revised Julian calendar, also called 'New calendar'. "At first, resistance to the New Calendar was muted". The Old Calendarists in Greece were at first a small number of laymen, priests and monks, whose number grew over the years.

Before they were joined by bishops, the Old Calendarist movement in Greece was only composed of priests and laypeople, of which "several hundreds monks from Athos".

In 1935, three bishops of the Church of Greece joined the movement and consecrated four new bishops for the movement. Of those three bishops, Metropolitan  of Florina became the leader of the Greek Old Calendarist movement. Of the three bishop who had joined, Chrysostom of Zakynthos soon left the movement after the consecration and went back to the Church of Greece. Of the four bishops consecrated, two joined the Church of Greece. This left the Greek Old Calendarist movement with four bishops: Chrysostomos of Florina, Germanos of Demetria, Germanos of the Cyclades, and Matthew (Karpoudakis) of Vrestheni. Those remaining four bishops created an Old Calendarist Holy Synod.

While the Greek Old Calendarists were "[o]riginally perhaps a million strong", they were severely persecuted by the State of Greece; Metropolitan Chrysostomos was imprisoned in Lesbos in 1951 as part of those persecutions.

Splits 

The Greek Old Calendarists experienced schism in 1937, due to a disagreement on the validity of the sacraments performed by members of churches which have adopted the reformed calendar. After Chrysostomos, head of the Holy Synod, refused to declare the sacraments of the New Calendarists as graceless, bishop Matthew led the group which seceded from the Holy Synod.

After this, Matthew ordained a number of bishops himself, and formed a separate Holy Synod of which he was the head as archbishop of Athens. Matthew died in 1950.

After Chrysostomos' death in 1955, his group had no bishop until 1960, when two bishops of the Russian Orthodox Church Outside of Russia (ROCOR) consecrated  archbishop. Akakios consecrated other bishops with the participation of another different ROCOR bishop. Under Auxentios, "complicated patterns of division and realignment occurred both within his own jurisdiction and among the followers of Archbishop Matthew". Due to this, in 1999 there were at least five different Greek Old Calendarist churches, each headed by a different archbishop of Athens. Additionally, there was also a 'Cyprianite' Greek Old Calendarist Church, whose adjective derive from its leader, bishop Cyprian of Oropos and Phyli.

In 1971, the ROCOR tried to unite the factions of Greek Old Calendarists, but failed. In 1999, the most important groups of Greek Old Calendarists were the Chrysostomites, the Matthewites, and the Cyprianites.

Romania 
Also in 1924, the Romanian Orthodox Church adopted the revised calendar; at this moment the Old Calendarist movement began in Romania. The abbot of Prokof, became the head of the Old Calendarist movement in Romania. Hierarchs in Greece supporting the Old Calendarist cause of Tanase did not manage to consecrate him bishop due to interventions of the Greek State.

By 1936, many parishes had left the Romanian Orthodox Church to become Old Calendarist, and more than forty new churches had been built for the use of Romanian Old Calendarist communities.

From 1935 and onwards, the Romanian government enacted "drastic measures" aimed to "eradicate organized opposition" to the Romanian Orthodox Church. Due to this, Romanian Old Calendarist churches and monasteries "were razed", and Romanian Old Calendarists activists were incarcerated. "Many, like Abbot Pambo, were killed and Glicherie Tanase was repeatedly imprisoned." Those persecutions went on "until the collapse of the [Romanian] regime at the end of the Second World War."

In 1955, one bishop of the Romanian Orthodox Church, Metropolitan , joined the Old Calendarist movement in Romania. Before they were joined by a bishops, the Old Calendarist movement in Romania was only composed of priests and laypeople, of which "several hundreds monks from Athos".

Metropolitan Galaction, while under house arrest, consecrated other Old Calendarist bishops: , Metodie, and Glicherie Tanase. Later, a Holy Synod of the Romanian Old Calendarists was "formally established".

Since the Ceaușescu period, the Romania Old Calendarist Church "has flourished, establishing a vigorous parochial and monastic life." Since the fall of Ceaușescu, the Romanian Old Calendarist movement "has grown notably."

The Romanian Old Calendarist movement remained united, unlike the Greek Old Calendarist movement.

Metropolitan Galaction was the first head of the Romanian Old Calendarist, until his death in 1959. Galaction was succeeded as head by Tanase, who became the second leader of the Romania Old Calendarist Church, from 1960 until his death in 1985. Tanase was canonized by the Romania Old Calendarist Church in 1999.

Bulgaria 

The Bulgarian Orthodox Church adopted the revised Julian calendar in 1968. The Protection Convent near Sofia became a center of the resistance those this adoption. In 1993, Photios of Triadista was consecrated bishop by the Cyprianite Old Calendarist Church to be hierarch of the Bulgarian Old Calendarists.

Intercommunion 
In 1977, a declaration of intercommunion between the Cyprianite Old Calendarist Church and the Romanian Old Calendarist Church was signed.

In 1994, an act establishing communion between the ROCOR and the Cyprianite Old Calendarist Church established full communion between those two churches, as well as between Romanian and Bulgarian Old Calendarist churches. Those four churches were therefore "in a single communion."

The Cyprianite Old Calendarist Church severed its communion with the ROCOR in 2005, because they considered the ROCOR was going to enter into a union with the Moscow Patriarchate, and had "jettisoned" its "anti-ecumenist outlook" as well as its cooperation with the Cyprianite Old Calendarist Church. Two weeks prior to the Cyprianite Old Calendarist Church's decision, the ROCOR had severed communion with the Cyprianite Old Calendarist Church due to its leader consecrating a bishop in Ossetia as Bishop .

Demography 
In 1999, it was estimated that "[t]here are probably over one million Old Calendarists in Romania, somewhat fewer in Greece, and considerably fewer in Bulgaria, Cyprus, and the [Eastern Orthodox] diaspora."

Categories 
There exists two trends within Old Calendarism. The first one is "resistance Old Calendarism", the second is "integrist Old Calendarism".

The first position "expresses resistance to what it sees as unlawful innovation and walls itself off from churches using the new calendar and compromised by what is seen as the heresy of ecumenism. It refuses, however, to condemn the rites and sacraments of New Calendarists as devoid of grace, and seeks by witness and courteous dialogue to draw the [Eastern] Orthodox majority to its traditionalist outlook." This trend is to be found for example in among the True Orthodox of Cyprianite stance.

The second position "rejects all New Calendarist churches, all those in communion with New Calendarists and all who refuse to reject the sacraments of the New Calendarists as outside the [Eastern] Orthodox Church and therefore as having sacraments devoid of grace." Churches which hold this position "see themselves as the surviving [Eastern] Orthodox church, maintaining the integrity of [Eastern] Orthodox tradition in the face of massive apostasy." This trend is to be found for example in the Old Calendarist churches of the Matthewite succession.

In 1999, it was noted that "a more recent cause of division, especially among Matthewites, is the icon of the Holy Trinity portraying God the Father as "the Ancient of Days": some Old Calendarists reject the icon, others reject the rejecters as iconoclasts."

Groups 
Old Calendarist groups include:

 Greek Old Calendarists, composed of numerous churches of which are:

Holy Synod of Milan
 Autonomous Orthodox Metropolia of North and South America and the British Isles

 Autonomous Orthodox Metropolis of Ecuador and Latin America
 True Orthodox Metropolis of Germany and Europe
Holy Orthodox Church in North America
Orthodox Church of Greece (Holy Synod in Resistance) (defunct)
 Old Calendar Bulgarian Orthodox Church
 Old Calendar Orthodox Church of Romania

See also 
 Eastern Orthodox liturgical calendar
 Independent sacramental movement
 New Calendarists
 Old Believers

References

Further reading

 
 
 Бочков П. В., свящ. Обзор неканонических православных юрисдикций XX—XXI вв.: монография. В 4 т. — Т. 4: Греческий старостильный раскол. — 2-е изд., испр. и доп. — СПб.: Своё издательство, 2018. — 282 с.
 

Publications by Old Calendarist clergy on the subject

 
 
 

The Ecclesiological Position of the Old Calendar Orthodox Church of Bulgaria , by Bishop Photii of Triaditsa

Christian terminology
Old Calendarism
Eastern Orthodox belief and doctrine
Julian calendar